Pomona-Pitzer Sagehens is the joint athletics program for Pomona College and Pitzer College, two of the Claremont Colleges. It competes in the Southern California Intercollegiate Athletic Conference (SCIAC) of the NCAA Division III. Its mascot is Cecil the Sagehen. Its primary rival is the Claremont-Mudd-Scripps Stags and Athenas, the joint team of the three other undergraduate Claremont Colleges.

Sports

There are 11 women's and 10 men's teams.

History
Pomona College's first intercollegiate sports teams were formed in 1895.
The college was one of the three founding members of the SCIAC in 1914, and its football team played in the inaugural game at the Los Angeles Coliseum in 1923, losing to the University of Southern California Trojans. Between 1946 and 1956, Pomona joined with Claremont Men's College (CMC) to compete as Pomona-Claremont. In 1970, Pomona began competing with Pitzer College (then seven years old) on an interim basis, and the arrangement became permanent two years later.

The Sagehens ranked 14th out of 438 Division III schools and 2nd among SCIAC schools in the 20212022 Division III NACDA Directors' Cup, which ranks athletics programs and awards points relative to their finish in NCAA championships. The water polo, track and field, women's soccer, and women's tennis teams are regarded as particularly strong.

National championships

Team

Facilities
Pomona-Pitzer's primary indoor athletics facility is the Liliore Green Rains Center for Sport and Recreation, built in 1989 and located near the center of Pomona's campus. It was reconstructed and renovated in 2022. The Rains Center is complemented by various outdoor facilities, mostly located within the naturalistic eastern portion of Pomona's campus known as the Wash.

Nickname and mascot

The official mascot of the teamPomona-Pitzer Sagehens is Cecil the Sagehen, a greater sage-grouse (Centrocercus urophasianus). The bird is a large ground-dweller native to the western United States (although not Southern California), and is distinguished by its long, pointed tail and complex lek mating system. It is named after the sagebrush on which it feeds.

Pomona-Pitzer is the only team in the world to use the Sagehen as a mascot, and it is often noted for its goofiness. Rather than in the grouse's natural brown and white colors, the mascot is rendered in the team's official colors, blue (for Pomona) and orange (for Pitzer).

The precise origin of the nickname is unknown. Pomona competed under a variety of names in its early years, including "the Blue and White" and "the Huns". The first known appearance of "Sagehens" was in a 1913 issue of The Student Life newspaper, and in 1918 it became the sole nickname. Later Pomona-Claremont began using it, and it is now the nickname for the combined Pomona-Pitzer team. The first known reference to "Cecil" was made in the 1946 Metate (Pomona's yearbook).

Rivalry
The Sagehens' primary rival is the Claremont-Mudd-Scripps Stags and Athenas, the joint team of the three other undergraduate Claremont Colleges. The rivalry is known as the Sixth Street Rivalry, referring to the street that separates the teams' athletics facilities. Historically, Pomona had a rivalry with the Occidental College Tigers.

Notable athletes

References

External links

 
 Coverage of the Sagehens in The Student Life